Joseph Richard Bisenius (born September 18, 1982) is an American former professional baseball pitcher and current area scout for the Minnesota Twins. He played for the Philadelphia Phillies and Washington Nationals.

College and draft

Bisenius attended Iowa Western Community College and Oklahoma City University.

Professional career

2004–2005
Bisenius began his career as a starter at short-season A-level Batavia, going 0–1 with a 1.43 earned run average (ERA) in 11 starts. The next season at Lakewood, Bisenius was converted to a reliever, posting a 6–4 record in 40 games, striking out 56 batters in  innings.

2006–2007
Bisenius earned a promotion to high-A Clearwater for the  season, where he pitched his way to a 4–1 record with a 1.93 ERA. He also struck out 62 batters, this time in only half a season before his promotion to AA Reading. He posted a 4–2 record for the new team, pitching  innings and striking out 33 batters. In , Bisenius made the Phillies' Opening Day roster, and made his Major League debut in a relief appearance on April 5, 2007. However, he returned to the minors, only to post a 3–4 record, struggling to a 5.48 ERA.

2008
Due to his pitching problems in the previous season, Bisenius started  at Reading. After pitching to a 3.62 ERA, though with a losing record, he was promoted to AAA Lehigh Valley. He posted an 0–1 record and an 11.81 ERA in 4 appearances, but was recalled to the majors on July 13, replacing R. J. Swindle. Bisenius became a roster victim when the Phillies acquired Joe Blanton from the Oakland Athletics, as he was optioned back to Lehigh Valley without pitching in a game.

2010
On May 7, 2010, he signed a minor league deal with the Washington Nationals, and was assigned to their team in Potomac.
Bisenus was called up to the Nationals in September 2010 and pitched five games in relief.

2011
On April 14, 2011, he signed a minor league contract with the Chicago White Sox. He split the season between the AA Birmingham Barons and AAA Charlotte Knights.

2012
For the 2012 season, Bisenius signed with the Saraperos de Saltillo in the Triple-A Mexican League.

2013
On June 20, 2013, he signed with the Atlanta Braves.  He pitched for Triple A Gwinnett Braves.

2014
In 2014, Bisenius played for the Lincoln Saltdogs of the American Association of Independent Professional Baseball.

2018
Hired by the Minnesota Twins as an area scout.

References

External links

Joe Bisenius at Baseball Almanac
Joe Bisenius at Baseball Gauge
Joe Bisenius at Pura Pelota (Venezuelan Professional Baseball League)

1982 births
Living people
Acereros de Monclova players
American expatriate baseball players in Canada
American expatriate baseball players in Mexico
Baseball players from Iowa
Batavia Muckdogs players
Birmingham Barons players
Charlotte Knights players
Clearwater Threshers players
Florida Complex League Phillies players
Gwinnett Braves players
Harrisburg Senators players
Iowa Western Reivers baseball players
Lakewood BlueClaws players
Lehigh Valley IronPigs players
Leones del Caracas players
Lincoln Saltdogs players
Major League Baseball pitchers
Mexican League baseball pitchers
Mississippi Braves players
Navegantes del Magallanes players
American expatriate baseball players in Venezuela
Oklahoma City Stars baseball players
Oklahoma City University alumni
Oklahoma State Cowboys baseball players
Olmecas de Tabasco players
Ottawa Lynx players
Peoria Saguaros players
Philadelphia Phillies players
Potomac Nationals players
Reading Phillies players
Rieleros de Aguascalientes players
Saraperos de Saltillo players
Sportspeople from Sioux City, Iowa
Syracuse Chiefs players
Tigres de Aragua players
Washington Nationals players
Duluth Huskies players